John Wertheimer (1799 – December 18, 1883) was an English printer. He was senior member of the firm of Wertheimer, Lea & Co.

From 1820 until his death he was actively engaged as a printer in London; and many important educational, medical, and philological works were issued from his press. His firm printed most of the works needing Hebrew type, also commercial reports and The Jewish Chronicle.

References
 

1799 births
1883 deaths
19th-century British Jews
19th-century printers
English printers
People from London